Pierre Dominique Costantini (1889–1986) was a French soldier, journalist, writer and Bonapartist militant.

Life
Costantini fought as an officer in the First World War and as a reserve officer in the armée de l'air during 1939–1940. He founded the Mouvement social européen. In 1940, he founded the collaborationist Ligue française d’épuration, d’entraide sociale et de collaboration européenne and with Jean Boissel, Marcel Déat, Pierre Clémenti (politician) and Eugène Deloncle co-founded the Légion des volontaires français contre le bolchevisme (LVF). He edited the Ligue's organ, the journal L'Appel. In 1943, he founded the Union des journalistes anti-maçons. He fled to Sigmaringen in 1944 and was condemned to prison in 1952. He later pursued a journalistic career and published several essays.

Works 
 La Grande pensée de Bonaparte, Paris, Éditions Baudinière, 1940.
 La Haute signification de la Légion des volontaires français contre le bolchevisme, Paris, L.V.F., circa [1942].
 Ode au masque de Napoléon, Paris, Éditions Baudinière, 1943.

Bibliography 
 Pascal Ory, Les collaborateurs, éditions du seuil, Paris, 1976.

1889 births
1986 deaths
French military personnel of World War I
French military personnel of World War II
French collaborators with Nazi Germany
French anti-communists
French male essayists
20th-century French essayists
20th-century French journalists
20th-century French male writers